SMA Negeri (SMAN) 1 Wanayasa is a senior high school located in Purwakarta Regency, West Java, Indonesia. It consists of three grades, 10 to 12. The school was established in 1993.

In 1985 SMAN 1 Wanayasa was still an affiliate of SMAN 1 Purwakarta and located on the campus of Junior High School 1 Wanayasa. After a purpose-built building was constructed, the school moved there. SMAN 1 Wanayasa is located amidst rice paddies. The school is located on Wanasari-Wanayasa Street.

SMAN 1 Wanayasa's motto is "For a Better Future".

References

External links 
 wanayasa.sch.id/ Official Website

Buildings and structures in West Java
Education in West Java
Schools in Indonesia